Khalid Kamal Hafīz (Urdu:, known with his honorifics as Sheikh Khalid Kamal Abdul Hafiz; 1 December 1938 Mubarakpur, British Raj – 6 December 1999 Wellington, New Zealand) was an Indian-born Imam who served as the senior religious advisor to the New Zealand Muslim community from 1982 to 1999.

As Imam

In 1992, Hafiz was interviewed by the Porirua newspaper Te Awa-iti regarding the Hajj although he declined to have his photograph taken directly following hate mail: "Khalid says he does not wish to complain and he is happy living in New Zealand society. We recognize that some people will be good, others not so good."

Death

Hafiz died in the Wellington suburb of Rongotai at the age of 61. Over 200 people attended his funeral and he was remembered in the Evening Post obituary as “an imam as imams should be, but rarely are.” The Post continued:

Literature
 Bob Shaw, “An imam ‘as imams should be, but rarely are’ ” in The Evening Post (16 December 1999), page. 5.
 “NZ Muslims threatened over Gulf crisis” in The New Zealand Herald (22 August 1990), page.1.
 “Peacelink” (October 1990), page. 1.
 Charles Mabbett, “Fasting and Feasting” in City Voice (2 March 1995), page.4.
 Drury, Abdullah, Islam in New Zealand: The First Mosque (Christchurch, 2007) 
 "Looking to Makkah" in Te Awa-iti (11 June 1992), page. 5.

References

External sources

http://www.iman.co.nz/index.htm?innerpage_fk.htm?khutbah/kava.htm

1938 births
1999 deaths
New Zealand imams
Indian emigrants to New Zealand
People from Azamgarh
Hafiz
Religious leaders from Wellington City
Deobandis